The Kentonmen MRT station is a mass rapid transit (MRT) station under construction that will serve the suburbs of Taman Bamboo, Taman Eastern, Taman Kok Lian, Taman Impian and Taman Rainbow in Kuala Lumpur, Malaysia.

It is one of the stations being built as part of the Klang Valley Mass Rapid Transit (KVMRT) project on the Putrajaya Line. The station is located on Jalan Ipoh as well as being named after the Batu Cantonment Army Camp, or Kem Batu Kentonmen in Malay. The station design is quite unique as only consist of one elevated platform level and two side concourse access area from two exits.

Station details

Location
The station is strategically located near landmarks such as Bamboo Hills and Cantonment Exchange Complex.

Nearby neighborhoods covered by this station:
Taman Bamboo
Taman Eastern
Taman Impian
Taman Kok Lian
Taman Rainbow

Nearby high-rise buildings covered by this station:
Pelangi Indah Condominium
Sri Intan 1 Condominium
Sri Intan 2 Condominium
Seri Gembira Apartment
Desa Alpha Condominium
Seri Anggun Condominium
Villa Angsana Condominium

Connection with KTM Komuter
The station is within walking distance to, but not integrated with  Batu Kentonmen station on the KTM Komuter Seremban Line.

Exits and entrances 
The station has a total of 2 entrances. Entrance A is located near to Taman Rainbow and Taman Eastern while Entrance B is placed near to Taman Bamboo. The feeder bus serves at the feeder bus stop located at Entrance A.

References

External links
 Klang Valley Mass Rapid Transit
 MRT Hawk-Eye View

Rapid transit stations in Kuala Lumpur
Sungai Buloh-Serdang-Putrajaya Line